Daniel Williamson may refer to:
Danny Williamson (footballer) (born 1973), former English footballer
A DJ, stage name LTJ Bukem
Daniel Alexander Williamson (1823–1903), British artist